Ada Developers Academy (Ada) is a year-long intensive school in software development for women and gender expansive people with no previous professional experience in computer programming. The program is tuition-free, and students can apply for a micro loan to meet living expenses during the year.  Additional supports available to students include laptops loans, childcare subsidies, free mental health therapy, and 1:1 mentors and tutors.

Overview
The program is divided into six months of classroom instruction and a five-month paid internship with a Seattle tech company. The first six months in the classroom focuses on Python, Flask, JavaScript, React, HTML and CSS, and computer science fundamentals. The last five months is an internship placement. Interns are placed at sponsor companies including Amazon, Concur, Microsoft, Nordstrom, Redfin, Tableau/Salesforce, Zillow, etc. for practical, applied learning experiences. 97% of Ada students graduate from the program, and 94% land full time roles as software developers within 180 days of graduating. The most recent graduating cohort reported an average starting salary of $125,000.

Cohorts

Ada begins new cohorts every 6 months (March & September), with in-person campuses in Seattle and Atlanta, a digital campus available nationwide, and a Washington, D.C. campus launching in 2024.

Funding 
Ada began in 2013 as a project of Seattle's Technology Alliance and is funded through company sponsorship, individual donors, and public sources. Ada now operates as an independent non-profit organization headquartered in Seattle, WA with campuses in Seattle, Atlanta, and Washington, D.C. (opening Fall 2023).  Ada also offers a digital campus available to students nationwide.  Ada's company sponsors include Amazon.com, Expedia, Zillow, and Chef. Sponsors provide applied learning internships for the students, and fund the students' education. Sponsoring companies such as Expedia stated that they participate in the program in order to recruit great talent, and also in order to improve their diversity. In 2021 Ada was one of four recipients of the Equality Can't Wait challenge grant funded by Melinda French Gates, Mackenzie Scott & Dan Jewitt, and the Charles and Lynn Schusterman Family Foundation.  This $10m grant is currently fueling Ada's national expansion, and aim to significantly shift the representation of women and gender expansive people in software development careers.

See also
 Ada Lovelace

References

External links
 

2013 establishments in Washington (state)
Educational institutions established in 2013
Coding schools
Non-profit organizations based in Seattle
Educational organizations based in the United States
Women's education in the United States
Women in computing
Women in Washington (state)
Education in Seattle
Computer science education in the United States